The melodius coqui or coquí melodioso (Eleutherodactylus wightmanae) is a frog species in the family Eleutherodactylidae endemic to Puerto Rico. Its natural habitats are subtropical or tropical moist lowland forest and subtropical or tropical moist montane forest.
It is threatened by habitat loss.

See also

Fauna of Puerto Rico
List of amphibians and reptiles of Puerto Rico

References

External links
Eleutherodactylus wightmanae Encyclopedia of Life page

Eleutherodactylus
Amphibians of Puerto Rico
Endemic fauna of Puerto Rico
Amphibians described in 1920
Taxonomy articles created by Polbot